Mepantadrea is a monotypic moth genus of the family Erebidae erected by George Hampson in 1926. Its only species, Mepantadrea simia, was first described by Saalmüller in 1891. It is found on Madagascar.

References

Calpinae
Monotypic moth genera